4FFF N618 is a discontinued electronic-book reader developed by an Indian Company, Condor Technology Associates, and based on a Linux platform. The device is sold under various brand names worldwide.

Features 
4FFF N618 provides a 16 levels of grayscale SiPix touchscreen display for viewing digital content. Pages are turned using the buttons on the device. The N618 connects to the internet through an available Wi-Fi connections.
Users can read books without a wireless connection: disconnecting the wireless connection can prolong the battery's charge for up to 29 days.

Specifications 
The Display is an electronic paper touchscreen from SiPix with 800×600 pixels (4:3) on 6 inch (167 ppi density) and 16 levels of grayscale.
 CPU
 Samsung 2416 ARM9 @ 400 MHz
 OS
 Linux 2.6.23
 Memory
 128 MB (MDDR)
 2 GB (NAND)
 External microSD/microSDHC (up to 16 GB)
 Connectivity
 Wi-Fi b/g
 microUSB high speed
 audio jack
 Miscellaneous
 1530 mAh, 3.7 V
 240 gram
 Reading mode
 10.000 pages (Wi-Fi off)
 3.000 pages (Wi-Fi on)
 Stand by mode: 700 hours

Formats supported 
 Text
 ePUB
 HTML
 PDF
 RTF
 TXT
 Picture
 BMP
 JPEG
 PNG
 Audio
 MP3

Sold as 
The device is sold worldwide under various brand names.
 Asia
 India: eGriver Touch

 Europe
 France: OYO (as released in October 2010 by Medion, chapitre.com/Direct Group Bertelsmann)
 Germany, Austria, Switzerland: OYO (Medion, Thalia)
 Switzerland: ImCoSys ereader
 Italy: DeVo eVreader
 Netherlands: ProMedia eBook Reader; Icarus Sense E650SR; OYO (Medion, Selexyz)
 Poland: OYO (Medion, Empik)
 Spain: Nvsbl L337 / Booq Avant / Papyre 6.2
 Russia: Mr. Book, One-XT, Айчиталка
 Bulgaria: Prestigio PER5062B
 Turkey: Reeder Reeder2
Across Europe available as:
 Icarus Sense

 Middle East
 Israel: E-vrit

 North America
 Canada: Pandigital Novel 6" Personal eReader
 United States: Qisda QD060B00 / Pandigital Novel 6" Personal eReader

 South America
 Brazil: Positivo Alfa (not supports any audio file)

Modification 
Being that the hardware utilizes Linux-based software it can be changed or improved to their heart's content. The firmware is labeled as “QT Software” and varies from vendor to vendor. The upgrade contains multiple image files with the extension of img, along with other system files.

Flashing to upgrade the firmware can be taken advantage of as it does not seem to check if the version that is being installed is older. Due to this, using firmware made by the other vendors on the model each sold in particular is possible.

Dual-boot 
The devices seem to contain a native dual-boot capability. When a device specific key combination is pressed during power-on any linux-kernel + ramdisk combination is booted from the sd-card.

References

External links 
 Official website 4FFF.com
 4FFF N618 User Manual (Dutch)
 MobileRead Wiki
 Oyo reader review (video)
 Reader review (blog)

Dedicated ebook devices
Electronic paper technology
Linux-based devices